Shout It Out may refer to:

 "Shout It Out" (Alisa Mizuki song)
 "Shout It Out" (BoA song)
 Shout It Out (Elli Erl album)
 Shout It Out (Hanson album)
 "Shout It Out" (Kingpin song)
 Shout It Out (Patrice Rushen album)
 "Shout It Out" (Reece Mastin song)
 "Shout It Out" (Shotgun Messiah song)
 "Shout It Out", a 2010 song by Marc Mysterio
 "Shout It Out", the theme song from The Wendy Williams Show

See also
 Shout It Out Loud (disambiguation)
 Shout (disambiguation)